Passalus inops is a beetle of the Family Passalidae.

References

Passalidae
Beetles described in 1857